Liberty Township is one of eight townships in Bollinger County, Missouri, USA. As of the 2000 U.S. Census, its population was 1,224. As of the 2010 U.S. Census, its population had increased to 1,371.

Demographics
As of the 2010 U.S. Census, there were 1,371 people living in the township. There were 627 housing units in the township. The racial makeup of the township was 98.61% White, 0.51% Native American, 0.07% Asian, 0.22% from other races, and 0.58% from two or more races. Approximately 0.51% of the population were Hispanic or Latino of any race.

Geography

Incorporated Areas
The township contains no incorporated settlements.

Unincorporated Areas
The township contains the unincorporated areas and historical communities of Dongola, Drum, Glennon, Hahn, Sank, and Schlatitz.

Cemeteries
The township contains the following six cemeteries: Cane Creek, Crites, Frazier, Kellion, Mansion, Mansker, and Wayne.

Streams
The streams of Cane Creek, Clubb Creek, Dry Creek, Gizzard Creek, Hawker Creek, Malone Creek, Perkins Creek, and Virgin Creek flow through Liberty Township. Other bodies of water located in the township include the Diversion Headwater Channel, Virgin Creek Lake, and Whippoorwill Lake.

Landmarks
Clubb Creek Conservation Area
Sank Conservation Area
Whippoorwill Lake Family Campground

Administrative Districts

School Districts
Advance R-IV School District 
Delta R-V School District 
Leopold R-III School District 
Woodland R-IV School District 
Zalma R-V School District

Political Districts
Missouri's 8th Congressional District
State House District 145 
State Senate District 27

References

 USGS Geographic Names Information System (GNIS)

External links
 US-Counties.com
 City-Data.com

Townships in Bollinger County, Missouri
Cape Girardeau–Jackson metropolitan area
Townships in Missouri